Pyroderces dimidiella is a moth in the family Cosmopterigidae. It is found on Sulawesi.

References

Natural History Museum Lepidoptera generic names catalog

dimidiella
Moths described in 1885